Troja is a Kosovar heavy metal band which consists of Bujar Berisha (vocals), Florent Bajrami (guitar), Violand Shabani (drums) and Agron Ejupi (bass). The band was originally formed by Ismajl (Mak) Beqaj (bass guitar) and Tomorr (Toma) Arifi (vocals) in 1990 in Pristina, SFR Yugoslavia. The same year Florent Bajrami (guitar) and Visar Blaku (drums) joined the band. Florent Bajrami remains the only original member of the band.

Band history 
The band was founded in 1990. Before they recorded their first album called People the band produced their first songs "Ekzistenca" (Existence) and "Për Bekin" (For Beki) at the Enis Presheva studio. The recording for their first album, "People", started in 1997 but the album was not published until 2003. In the mid-90s Beqaj and Blaku departed from the band and were replaced by Agron Ejupi on bass guitar and Bujar Berisha on drums. In 2006 singer Tomorr Arifi left the band and drummer Bujar Berisha took on vocal duties. Bujar was replaced on the drums by Violand (Land) Shabani. In 2009 they produced their second studio album Amaneti - I Clown It. In 1994 the band won the best rock band award at the Boom Festival. The video People was awarded for the best Albanian rock video in 2003 and best camera direction. In 2007 they were participants at "SubKultura Urbane" which was broadcast live at Reception Room in Pristina. In 2009 they recorded a new video called Amaneti i Clown-it which was awarded for the best video at Top Fest in Tirana, Albania and was also the winner of the Best Video award.

Appearances & Awards 

 1994 = Best Rock band
 1993 = Concert in theater - DODONA - 1993 - Concert in Kosovska Mitrovica
 1993 = Rock Fest - Pejë
 1993 = Rock Fest - Shkup
 1994 = Boom Festival - 1st place (night of the rock music)
 1995 = Recording songs - Ekzistenca - Për Bekin - Kosovska Mitrovica
 1997 = Show Fest.
 1997 = ODA band concert (Casablanca).
 1997 = Recording two songs in Pejë.
 2002 = First Album recorded - PEOPLE
 2003 = First Video, song called with the same name - PEOPLE
 2003 = Music video People: Best Albanian rock video and best camera direction
 2003 = Winner of the Best Camera - Music Video Award - Prishtina.
 2003 = Winner of the best Directing on "Netët e Video Klipit Shqiptar" - Tirana Albania.
 2004 = Participant on TOP FEST - Tirana - Albania with the song called "Jena Na".
 2006 = TROJA's big concert - with 2500 people!
 2007 = Video of the song called "Nuk Po Muj Ma".
 2007 = Opening for the BTR band from Bulgary in Prizren.
 2007 = SubKultura Urbane, Live in Reception Room.
 2009 = New Album (Amaneti I Clown-it & the Video).
 2009 = TROJA - Amaneti i Clown-it "WINNER OF THE BEST VIDEO" - TOP FEST TIRANA - ALBANIA.
 2009 - TROJA - Amaneti i Clown-it "Winner of the Best Group, Best Rock & the Public Price" Video Music Award in Prishtina - Kosovo.
 2010 = Winner of BEST GROUP Award in Top Fest 7th edition in Albania.
 2010 = LIVE Concert Pristina.
 2010 = New video "Mretnesha Kohe"

Discography

Albums 

 People (full-length 2003)
 Amaneti - I "Clown" It (full-length 2009)
 One (2015)

Videos 

 People (2003)
 Jena Na (2006)
 Nuk Po Muj Ma (2007)
 Amaneti i Clown-it (2009)
 Mbretnesha kohe (2010)
 Demokraci (2015)

References

External links
 Official homepage (in Albanian)
 Troja music videos at YouTube
 Official MySpace page

 
Albanian rock music groups
Musical groups established in 1990
Musical quartets
Kosovan musical groups